Supriyono Salimin (born 10 August 1981) is an Indonesian footballer who played as full-back.

Club career 
He started his career in the season 1999-2000, with PSIS Semarang. In 2001, he moved to PSMS Medan, playing 2 seasons. He got his first national team call-up whilst with this club in 2002. In 2003, he returned to Java with Persikota Tangerang. He was then loaned to Persipasi Bekasi for 6 months.

In 2005, he signed a 2-year contract with Persita Tangerang. In the 2007 Liga Indonesia Premier Division he played for Persmin Minahasa, enjoying 30 matches and scoring 2 goals. After the team folded because of financial problems, he moved to Persija Jakarta.

In the 2009-10 Indonesia Super League, he played 26 matches for Persebaya Surabaya. After one season in Surabaya, he moved to Makassar to join PSM Makassar. He played in 11 matches that season. Last season  he signed a contract with Samarindan club Persisam Putra Samarinda. He played 30 matches and he received 4 yellow cards.

In December 2014, he signed with Gresik United.

International career 
He started his international career with the Indonesia national football team in 2002.

References

External links 
 

1981 births
Association football defenders
Living people
Indonesian footballers
Indonesia international footballers
Liga 1 (Indonesia) players
Persebaya Surabaya players
Persija Jakarta players
Persisam Putra Samarinda players
PSM Makassar players
Indonesian Premier Division players
Persikota Tangerang players
Persipasi Bekasi players
Persita Tangerang players
Persmin Minahasa players
PSIS Semarang players
PSMS Medan players
gresik United players
1996 AFC Asian Cup players